Emil Jens Baumann Adolf Jerichau (17 April 1816 – 25 July 1883) was a Danish sculptor. He belonged to the generation immediately after Bertel Thorvaldsen, for whom he worked briefly in Rome, but gradually moved away from the static Neoclassicism he inherited from him and towards a more dynamic and realistic style. He was a professor at the Royal Danish Academy of Fine Arts and its director from 1857 to 1863.

Early life and career

Jens Adolf Jerichau was born in Assens on the Danish island of Funen to grocer and lieutenant Carl Christian Jerichau and his wife Karen Birch. He worked in a painter's apprenticeship for one and a half years before traveling to Copenhagen where he was admitted to the Royal Academy of Fine Arts in 1831. He was accepted into the model school in 1833 and continued to the painting school, at the same time studying privately with painter Christoffer Wilhelm Eckersberg after winning both silver medals. Then in 1836 he started sculpting with German-born sculptor Hermann Ernst Freund.

Years in Rome
 
After graduating from the Academy in 1837, Jerichau traveled to Rome where he initially worked for around a year in Bertel Thorvaldsen's studio. His early works such as the sculpture Hercules and Hebe (1846, original model in the Ny Carlsberg Glyptotek) as well as his colossal Christ figure from 1849 are in a strong Neoclassical style which bear clear testament to Thorvaldsen. He established his calling through a bas-relief on a frieze in the royal palace Christiansborg in Copenhagen, depicting the marriage of Alexander the Great to Roxane.  Completed in 1864, it was later burned as were a number of his most famous works which were damaged or ruined in a fire in the Christiansborg Palace in 1884.

Finding his own style

With his sculpture group Penelope (1845–46, Danish National Gallery), which won international acclaim, he moved away from the static Neoclassicism and towards a more dramatic and dynamic style. He created also formed depictions of nature, such as The Panther Hunter  (1846, Danish National Gallery).

Among his more notable works would be Hans Christian Ørsted Monument dedicated to physicist Hans Christian Ørsted. The monument was cast in  bronze on a base of granite. At the foot of the statue sit the three Norns of Norse mythology; Urðr (the past), Verðandi (the present) and Skuld (the future). Situated at Ørstedsparken in central Copenhagen, the monument was  inaugurated in 1876.

Family 
Jerichau married the painter Elisabeth Jerichau-Baumann and they had 9 children. They were the parents of composer Thorald Jerichau, and landscape artists Harald Jerichau and Holger H. Jerichau.

Jens Adolf Jerichau died in Copenhagen and was buried at Solbjerg Park Cemetery.

Selected works
Adam and Eve before the Fall (1863) Ny Carlsberg Glyptotek, Copenhagen
 Standing Goat (1845) Danish National Gallery, Copenhagen
Bathing Girls 	(1862) Danish National Gallery, Copenhagen
 Sleeping Reaper  (1852) Ny Carlsberg Glyptotek, Copenhagen
Little Girl with a Dead Bird (1871) Ny Carlsberg Glyptotek, Copenhagen
The Panther Hunter (1846) Danish National Gallery, Copenhagen
 Slave Girl (1860) Danish National Gallery, Copenhagen

Public art
 H. C. Ørsted Memorial (1871) at Ørsted Park in Copenhagen 
 Crucifix   (1854) Jesus Church, Valby, Copenhagen
 King David  (1860) Church of Our Lady, Copenhagen

See also

 Art of Denmark

Bibliography
Nicolaj Bøgh, Erindringer af og om Jens Adolf Jerichau (1884).

References

External links
 Jens Adolf Jerichau at Kunstindeks Danmark

1816 births
1883 deaths
19th-century Danish sculptors
19th-century male artists
People from Assens Municipality
Academic staff of the Royal Danish Academy of Fine Arts
Royal Danish Academy of Fine Arts alumni
Directors of the Royal Danish Academy of Fine Arts
Recipients of the Thorvaldsen Medal